The Wanderer is the first album by the Ukrainian folk metal band Holy Blood. It was self-released on May 13, 2002, and re-released in 2005 by Bombworks Records. Musically, the album is a hybrid mixture of black metal and folk metal with Celtic influences and occasional death metal undercurrents, such as on the song "Kill". The overall output is more aggressive than anything the band has released since. The last song on the album is an industrial music remix of the song "Kill". On the Bombworks edition, all of the lyrics are printed in English, although they are sung in Russian. In 2006, the album was re-issued in Ukraine with different cover art.

Track listing
All music by Holy Blood.

Personnel
Fedor Buzilevich – lead vocals, flute
Olexiy Furman – lead guitar
Myhaylo Rodionov – rhythm guitar
Eugeniy Tsesaryov – bass
Dmitry Titorenko – drums
Vera Knyazyova – keyboards, vocals

References

Holy Blood (band) albums
2002 debut albums